The Marty Feldman Comedy Machine is a 1971 comedy-variety sketch series, starring British comedian Marty Feldman.

Co-produced by ATV in the UK and ABC TV in the United States, it was recorded at ATV's Elstree Studios. It features opening and closing credits animated by Terry Gilliam, as well as featuring guest appearances by Spike Milligan, John Junkin and Frances de la Tour. It also featured sketches written by Barry Levinson and Larry Gelbart.

Long unavailable, the complete series was to be released on DVD in the UK through Network on 6 June 2016. However, the release has been postponed indefinitely for unspecified reasons.

References

External links

1971 British television series debuts
1971 British television series endings
1970s British television sketch shows
Television series by ITC Entertainment
Television series by ITV Studios
English-language television shows
Television shows produced by Associated Television (ATV)
Television shows shot at ATV Elstree Studios